Medicine for Melancholy is a 2008 independent romantic drama film written and directed by Barry Jenkins. The film stars Wyatt Cenac, Tracey Heggins, and Elizabeth Acker.

The film had its world premiere at South by Southwest on March 7, 2008. It was released in a limited release on January 30, 2009, by IFC Films.

Plot
Medicine for Melancholy chronicles the one-day romance of Micah (Wyatt Cenac) and Jo (Tracey Heggins), two black twenty-somethings who have a one-night stand and end up spending a full day and night together despite Jo's long-distance relationship with a wealthy white gallery owner. The characters wake up in someone else's bed after a party and head their separate ways. Jo leaves her wallet in their shared taxi and they reconnect when he returns it to her at her apartment. Throughout the day, Micah and Jo visit the Museum of the African Diaspora, stumble upon an affordable housing coalition meeting and attend a concert. Venturing around San Francisco, the characters discuss race and gentrification with regard to the low percentage of blacks living in San Francisco. Micah is openly critical of Jo's interracial relationship as he struggles to reconcile his black identity with the predominantly white world of the hipster scene in San Francisco.

Production
Jenkins wrote the film two years prior to its release. Medicine for Melancholy mainly confronts themes of African American assimilation into "hipster" or "indie" culture. The city of San Francisco also emphasizes African-Americans as the minority, because African-Americans are seven percent of San Francisco's population.  Writer and director Barry Jenkins has described the film's two main characters as "playing out a debate back and forth about identity politics". Each of the two main characters embodies an ideology. Jenkins saw the character of Micah as a man who was always building barriers, whereas Jo thinks that race is a limiter. Accusing Jo of assimilation, Micah strives to reclaim his essential "blackness" as Jo contrastingly claims Micah has a "hang up" about his race and strives to overcome her own. The film includes desaturation of images. Filmmakers went through the film shot by shot and pulled out the majority of color. In an interview, director Barry Jenkins stated that certain scenes in the film have more color to reflect when the characters are not thinking about race or housing issues.

Release
The film had its world premiere at South by Southwest on March 7, 2008. It went on to screen at the Los Angeles Film Festival on June 20, 2008. Shortly after, IFC Films acquired distribution rights to the film. It also screened at the Toronto International Film Festival in September, and at the Mar del Plata International Film Festival in November where it was nominated for Best Film. It was released in a limited release on January 30, 2009.

Critical reception
Roger Ebert of the Chicago Sun-Times gave the film 3.5 out of 4 stars, calling the actors "effortlessly engaging" and the direction "assured"; he also noted the film was "beautifully photographed". It was a New York Times Critics' Pick and nominated for three 2008 Independent Spirit Awards. On Rotten Tomatoes, it has an 83% fresh rating.

Accolades

References

External links
 
 
 
 

2008 directorial debut films
2008 films
2008 independent films
2008 romantic drama films
African-American films
American independent films
American romantic drama films
Films directed by Barry Jenkins
Films set in museums
Films set in San Francisco
Films set in the San Francisco Bay Area
Films shot in San Francisco
Works about gentrification
2000s English-language films
2000s American films